Captain Samuel John Shephard, GC (born 20 July 1987) is a serving officer in the Royal Marines, who was awarded the George Cross in 2014 for his efforts to rescue a fellow officer, Lieutenant Damien "Day" Moran, during a diving exercise in El Qoseir, Egypt, the previous year.

Early life and education
Shephard was born on 20 July 1987 in Craigavon, County Armagh, Northern Ireland. He was educated at The Royal School, Armagh as a day pupil. In March 2004, he was the youngest player to win the Rugby Schools Cup against Campbell College in the final at Ravenhill, Belfast. He studied at Queen's University, Belfast, and graduated with a Bachelor of Science degree in marine biology and a Master of Science degree in fisheries and aquaculture.

Military career
On 5 September 2011, Shephard was commissioned in the Royal Marines as a second lieutenant; he was subsequently promoted to acting lieutenant. He was promoted to lieutenant on 13 December 2012, and to captain on 1 September 2013. In 2013, he served a four-month tour of duty in Afghanistan as part of the War in Afghanistan.

Honours
On 3 October 2014, Shephard was awarded the George Cross (GC), the highest award in the United Kingdom honours system for gallantry "not in the face of the enemy". Soon after his award he became a member of the Victoria Cross and George Cross Association.

References

1987 births
Living people
British recipients of the George Cross
Royal Marines Commando officers
Royal Navy personnel of the War in Afghanistan (2001–2021)
People educated at The Royal School, Armagh
People from Craigavon, County Armagh
Alumni of Queen's University Belfast